Chlorosulfuric acid (IUPAC name: sulfurochloridic acid) is the inorganic compound with the formula HSO3Cl. It is also known as chlorosulfonic acid, being the sulfonic acid of chlorine. It is a distillable, colorless liquid which is hygroscopic and a powerful lachrymator. Commercial samples usually are pale brown or straw colored.

Salts and esters of chlorosulfuric acid are known as chlorosulfates.

Structure and properties
Chlorosulfuric acid is a tetrahedral molecule. The formula is more descriptively written SO2(OH)Cl, but HSO3Cl is traditional. It is an intermediate, chemically and conceptually, between sulfuryl chloride (SO2Cl2) and sulfuric acid (H2SO4). The compound is rarely obtained pure.  Upon standing with excess sulfur trioxide, it decomposes to pyrosulfuryl chlorides:
2 ClSO3H + SO3 → H2SO4 + S2O5Cl2

Synthesis
The industrial synthesis entails the reaction of hydrogen chloride with a solution of sulfur trioxide in sulfuric acid:
HCl + SO3 → ClSO3H
It can also be prepared by chlorination of sulfuric acid, written here for pedagogical purposes as HSO3(OH), vs. the usual format H2SO4:
PCl5 + HSO3(OH) → HSO3Cl + POCl3 + HCl
The latter method is more suited for laboratory-scale operations.

Applications
ClSO2OH is used to prepare alkyl sulfates, which are useful as detergents and as chemical intermediates:
ROH + ClSO3H → ROSO3H + HCl

An early synthesis of saccharin begins with the reaction of toluene with ClSO2OH to give the ortho- and para-toluenesulfonyl chloride derivatives:
CH3C6H5 + 2 ClSO2OH → CH3C6H4SO2Cl + H2SO4 + HCl
Oxidation of the ortho isomer gives the benzoic acid derivative that then is cyclized with ammonia and neutralized with base to afford saccharin.

Reaction with hydrogen peroxide is used to produce peroxydisulfuric acid ("persulfuric acid") and peroxydisulfates. These are used as oxidizing agents and for initiating free radical polymerization, for example to produce polytetrafluoroethylene (Teflon).

Chlorosulfonic acid has been used as an anti-contrail agent in Ryan Model 147 reconnaissance drones, and to produce smoke screens.

Safety
ClSO3H reacts violently with water to yield sulfuric acid and hydrogen chloride, commonly seen as vapors fuming from the liquid:

ClSO3H + H2O → H2SO4 + HCl

Precautions, such as proper ventilation, associated with HCl should be observed.

Related halosulfuric acids
Fluorosulfonic acid, FSO2OH, is a related strong acid with a diminished tendency to evolve hydrogen fluoride.
Bromosulfonic acid, BrSO2OH, is unstable, decomposing at its melting point of 8 °C to give bromine, sulfur dioxide, and sulfuric acid.
Iodosulfonic acid is not known to occur.

References

Oxohalides
Reagents for organic chemistry
Sulfur oxoacids
Sulfuryl compounds
Lachrymatory agents